Toyun Ranch (also as Tuoyun Ranch) is a ranch located along China–Kyrgyzstan border in Wuqia County, Xinjiang Uygur Autonomous Region, China, it is operated and managed by the 3rd Division of Xinjiang Production and Construction Corps. Its geographical coordinates are 74°50 ́  ́- 67°10 ́, north latitude 39°45 ́ - 40°40´, the altitude 2,147-4,391 meters. Its headquarters is located at Kizilmoynok, 60 km from Kashgar and 115 km from the Turugart Port. Turugart - Kashi Highway passes through the field.

Tuoyun Ranch has a land area of 522 square kilometers, including 20 hectares of arable land and 440 square kilometers of natural grassland. As of 2017, the total population is 1,007, with the ethnic minorities of 898 population accounting for  89.2% of the total. There are 3 animal husbandry companys, a school, a health center and a community service center. Tuoyun Ranch is mainly engaged in raising sheep, its industrial structure is single. It belongs to alpine mountainous areas with poor natural conditions, bad weather and frequent natural disasters. Because of that, the development of its economy is slow.

History

The predecessor of Toyun Ranch was formed by the merger of the four army sheep farms of Toyun, Moji, Ying'erand Aying, and the ranch of the 13th Division Of the National Army in January 1951. It was transferred to the Production Management Office of the South Xinjiang Military Region in March 1953, and named the 3rd Ranch of the Production Management Office. The Production and Management Office was incorporated into the 1st Agriculture Construction Division in April 1955, it was named the 3rd Ranch of the 1st Agriculture Construction Division. In January 1959, the ranch was merged to Qianjin General Farm, named the 3rd Ranch of Qianjin General Farm. In September 1962, the 1st Agriculture Construction Division took back the direct leadership and restored the name of the 3rd Ranch of the 1st Agriculture Construction Division. In September 1962, the 2nd Ranch of the 1st Agriculture Construction Division in Yecheng was transferred to the 3rd Agriculture Construction Division, the 3rd Ranch was replenished as the 2nd Tongyun Ranch of the 1st Agriculture Construction Division . With the abolition of the Xinjiang Production and Construction Corps in 1975, the 2nd Toyun Ranch was transferred to Kizilsu Prefecture and named the Ranch of Kizilsu Prefecture, and it was renamed Ranch of Wuqia County in January 1977. In May 1982, it was transferred to the leadership of Kizilsu Prefecture Bureau of Farms and Land Reclamation, and renamed to the 2nd Toyun Ranch of Kizilsu Prefecture. In April 1982, the 3rd Agriculture Construction Division was restored, and in April 1984, the 2nd Toyun Ranch was transferred to the 3rd Division, it was renamed Toyun Ranch of the 3rd Division.

In 2006, Toyun Ranch was combined to the Jiashi General Farm by trusteeship, with the Jiashi General Farm as the center, two CPC party committees, two sets of leading bodies and two agencies' leadership and management systems. In February 2010, Toyun Ranch was restored as a separate unit of the 3rd Division of the XPCC.

Health care
Toyun Ranch has a health center, 3 company clinics with A total of 12 hospital beds and 16 medical staff. In 2017, outpatient treatment was more than 1,264 people, outpatient visited 4,260 people. A health profile for people with hypertension, diabetes and infectious diseases was established, and 226 married women of childbearing age were surveyed free of charge in the year.

Education
The ranch has a school for primary and secondary education, and a kindergarten. As of 2017,  there were 7 full-time teachers with 46 students of secondary education, 19 full-time teachers with 123 students of primary education. The admission rate of baby children reached 100%, and the enrollment rate of primary and secondary school-age children were all 100%.

References 

Township-level divisions of Wuqia County
Xinjiang Production and Construction Corps